Ihor Dmytrovych Oshchypko (born 25 October 1985) is a Ukrainian amateur and former professional footballer who plays as a left back for Feniks Pidmonastyr and current technical coach of Karpaty Halych.

Club career

Karpaty Lviv
He was promoted from the reserves squad of Karpaty Lviv and debuted in the Premier League on 1 March 2008.

Botev Plovdiv
On 18 January 2016 Oshchypko signed a contract with Botev Plovdiv. In his debut in A Grupa, on 20 February 2016, he provided an assist for the goal scored by Lachezar Baltanov for the 1-0 win over the local rivals Lokomotiv Plovdiv.

References

External links
 
 
 
 

1985 births
Living people
People from Ivano-Frankivsk Oblast
Piddubny Olympic College alumni
Ukrainian footballers
Ukraine international footballers
Ukrainian expatriate footballers
FC Mostransgaz Gazoprovod players
FC Shakhtar Donetsk players
FC Shakhtar-2 Donetsk players
FC Shakhtar-3 Donetsk players
FC Karpaty Lviv players
SK Sturm Graz players
CSF Bălți players
Botev Plovdiv players
Ukrainian Premier League players
Ukrainian First League players
Ukrainian Second League players
Ukrainian Amateur Football Championship players
Austrian Football Bundesliga players
Austrian Regionalliga players
First Professional Football League (Bulgaria) players
Moldovan Super Liga players
Expatriate footballers in Russia
Ukrainian expatriate sportspeople in Russia
Expatriate footballers in Austria
Ukrainian expatriate sportspeople in Austria
Association football defenders
Expatriate footballers in Moldova
Ukrainian expatriate sportspeople in Moldova
Expatriate footballers in Bulgaria
Ukrainian expatriate sportspeople in Bulgaria
FC Lviv players
FC Stal Kamianske players
FC Mynai players
Ukrainian football managers